The Negev Summit is a conference that took place on 27–28 March 2022 in Sde Boker, Israel, in which Israeli Foreign Minister Yair Lapid hosted the foreign ministers of Bahrain, Egypt, Morocco and the United Arab Emirates, as well as U.S. Secretary of State Antony Blinken.

The four Arab countries present at the conference were represented by their Foreign Ministers: Abdullah bin Zayed Al Nahyan, Foreign Minister of the United Arab Emirates; Abdullatif bin Rashid Al Zayani, from Bahrain; Nasser Bourita, Minister of Foreign Affairs of Morocco;  Sameh Shoukry, Foreign Minister from Egypt. 

It was reported that the purpose of the summit was a demonstration of a united political and security front against Iran, against the background of the striving for the renewal of a nuclear agreement by the P5+1 powers and Iran, and against Iran's aggression throughout the Middle East.

History
The meeting was organized by Foreign Minister Yair Lapid and its primary purpose was to establish an international alliance against the nuclear program of Iran. Initially, the idea was to bring together as many countries as possible from the Abrahamic Accords, in order to strengthen and deepen ties. This is a few days after the Prime Minister of Israel, Naftali Bennett, also visited Egypt. The Jordanian foreign minister was also offered to join the conference, but he held a series of meetings in Kuwait at the time.

Summit

The foreign ministers of Israel, Egypt, Morocco, Bahrain and the United Arab Emirates, and the United States Secretary of State, met at Sde Boker in the Negev, Israel, and decided to hold regular meetings about regional security and commit to further expanding economic and diplomatic cooperation.

The six foreign ministers who participated in the summit decided to set up a number of joint working groups. The first to discuss national security and the war on terror and other working groups will be education, health, energy, tourism, food and water. In addition, the six foreign ministers agreed that each annual (or semi-annual) meeting would convene in a different desert city, to symbolize the issue common to all relevant countries: the need to improve water supply, desert tourism, book settlement localization and food security concerns. Topics raised included wheat prices, the Western Sahara question, piracy in the Red Sea, and dealing with launching UAVs and long-range missiles, in addition raising opposition to the JCPOA nuclear deal with Iran and resisting its proxies.

United States Secretary of State Antony Blinken said that the meeting "could expand the potential for peace and conflict resolution across the region." He also said that he supported a two-state solution for Palestine and criticized the construction of Israeli settlements on disputed territory as well as Palestinian payments to the families of terrorists. Arab government attendees also said that Israel "must make progress on implementing a two-state solution for the Palestinians with East Jerusalem as its capital."

During the summit, an attack took place in Hadera in which two police officers were shot by a pair of Israeli Arabs who had sworn allegiance to ISIS. All summit participants unanimously condemned the attack.

References

2022 in international relations
March 2022 events in Israel
Conferences in Israel
Arab–Israeli alliance against Iran
Abraham Accords
Naftali Bennett
Bahrain–Egypt relations
Bahrain–Israel relations
Bahrain–Morocco relations
Bahrain–United Arab Emirates relations
Bahrain–United States relations
Egypt–Israel relations
Egypt–Morocco relations
Egypt–United Arab Emirates relations
Egypt–United States relations
Israel–Morocco relations
Israel–United Arab Emirates relations
Israel–United States relations
Morocco–United Arab Emirates relations
Morocco–United States relations
United Arab Emirates–United States relations